Alphonse Piché (14 February 1917 – 1 January 1998) was a Canadian poet. He won a 1976 Governor General's Awards.

Life
He studied at the Saint-Joseph seminary.
He lived most of his life in Trois-Rivières. 
His poetry addresses the themes of the people struggling with the agonies and joys of everyday life. 
He lived long near the St. Lawrence River on which he sailed. 
His latest collection deliver the words of a man in love with life, in the face of old age and death.

His papers are held at the Bibliothèque et Archives nationales du Québec.

A poetry prize is named for him.

Awards
 1947 - Prix David, Ballades de la petite extrace
 1966 - Grand prix littéraire de la Société Saint-Jean-Baptiste de la Mauricie
 1976 - Prix littéraire du Gouverneur général du Canada, Poèmes 1946-1950
 1989 - Ludger-Duvernay Prize
 1992 - Membre de l'Ordre du Canada

Works
 Ballades de la petite extrace, Editions Fernand Pilon, 1946
 Remous, F. Pilon, 1947
 Voie d'eau, F. Pilon, 1950
 Poèmes 1946-1966, Editions du Bien Public, 1966
 Poèmes 1946-1968, Éditions de l'Hexagone, 1976
 Dernier Profil 1982 
 Fenêtre/Haïku L. Lavoie Maheux, 1986
 Le choix d'Alphonse Piché dans l'œuvre d'Alphonse Piché, Les Presses Laurentiennes, 1987, 
 Sursis, Écrit forges, 1987, 
 Fables, L'Hexagone, 1989, 
 Néant fraternel, Écrits des Forges, 1991, 
 Retour, Ecrits des Forges, 1997,

References

External links

1998 deaths
Members of the Order of Canada
1917 births
Writers from Quebec
Canadian male poets
20th-century Canadian poets
Canadian poets in French
20th-century Canadian male writers